This is a list of active duty rear admirals (two-star rear admiral, abbreviated RADM) serving in the United States Navy, United States Coast Guard, United States Public Health Service Commissioned Corps and National Oceanic and Atmospheric Administration Commissioned Officer Corps.

Joint positions

Department of Defense

Office of the Secretary of Defense

Joint Chiefs of Staff

Unified Combatant Commands

Other joint positions

United States Navy and Marine Corps

Department of the Navy

United States Marine Corps

United States Navy

Other services

Department of Homeland Security

United States Coast Guard

Department of Health and Human Services

United States Public Health Service Commissioned Corps

Department of Justice

Department of Commerce

National Oceanic and Atmospheric Administration Commissioned Officer Corps

List of pending appointments

Awaiting reassignment

Retaining current position/position unannounced
These are flag officers awaiting promotion to rear admiral while retaining their current position or do not have their position announced yet.

See also
List of active duty United States four-star officers
List of active duty United States three-star officers
List of active duty United States Army major generals
List of active duty United States Marine Corps major generals
List of active duty United States Air Force major generals
List of active duty United States Space Force general officers
List of active duty United States senior enlisted leaders and advisors
List of current United States National Guard major generals
List of United States Army four-star generals
List of United States Marine Corps four-star generals
List of United States Navy four-star admirals
List of United States Air Force four-star generals
List of United States Coast Guard four-star admirals

References

Rear admirals
Rear Admirals

Two-star officers
United States rear admirals